The Roman Catholic Diocese of Juticalpa (erected 6 March 1949, as the Territorial Prelature of Inmaculada Concepción de la B.V.M. en Olancho) is a suffragan of the Archdiocese of Tegucigalpa. It was elevated as the Diocese of Juticalpa on 31 October 1987.

Bishops

Ordinaries
Bernardino N. Mazzarella, O.F.M. (1954–1963)
Nicholas D'Antonio Salza, O.F.M. (1963–1977)
Tomás Andrés Mauro Muldoon, O.F.M. (1983–2012)
José Bonello, O.F.M. (2012–)

Coadjutor bishop
José Bonello, O.F.M. (2010-2012)

See also
Catholic Church in Honduras
Immaculate Conception Cathedral, Juticalpa

References

External links
 

Juticalpa
Juticalpa
Juticalpa
1949 establishments in Honduras
Roman Catholic Ecclesiastical Province of Tegucigalpa